The 2017 Trinidad and Tobago FA Trophy was the 86th season of the FA Trophy, which is the oldest football competition for teams in Trinidad and Tobago. North East Stars entered as the tournament's defending champion, who defeated W Connection 5-4 on penalties after a 0–0 in the 2014–15 final at Ato Boldon Stadium. The tournament began on 16 September with 64 teams competing in single elimination matches and will conclude with the final on 8 December. W Connection won their 5th FA Trophy after beating Police 3-1 in the final at the Ato Boldon Stadium.

Qualification
The 2017–18 FA Trophy will involve all ten Pro League clubs, twenty Super League sides, six each from the Northern FA, Eastern FA, Central FA, Southern FA, and five from the Tobago FA and the Eastern Counties Football Union (ECFU).

The following clubs qualified for the 83rd edition of the FA Trophy:

Schedule
The schedule for the 2017–18 FA Trophy, as announced by the Trinidad and Tobago Football Association:

Results
All matches were played over two 45 minute halves, and in the process if the match were drawn at the end of regulation time, penalty kicks will decide the outcome.

Round of 64
The draw for the most prestigious knockout tournament held by the Trinidad and Tobago Football Association was made on 22 August 2017 at its head office in the Ato Boldon Stadium with ties played on 16 and 17 of September 2017.

Round of 32
The matches of the Round of 32 are as follows and will be played from 1 to 5 October 2017.

Round of 16
The draws for the Round of 16 are as follows. Morvant Caledonia United made another leap towards a fourth FA Trophy by ousting fellow Pro League compatriots and defending champions North East Stars 4-1 on penalties following a 1-1 draw in one of six Round-of-16 clashes contested on Sunday. Connection, four-time former champions, edged Super League’s Cunupia FC 3-2 in a fiery contest that saw three red cards, a missed penalty, a converted penalty, and a “Showtime” double at the Mannie Ramjohn Stadium. But six-time former champions Defence Force, led by an uninterrupted hat-trick from Trinidad and Tobago attacking midfielder Hashim Arcia, made light work of Central 500 Spartans, trashing the Super League outfit 5-1 at Barataria Oval. Three-time former champions, Police FC, left it late against WASA FC’s Eastern Football Association (EFA) side for a 2-1 win through goals by Elijah Belgrave and Kenaz Williams 89th and 92nd minutes to overturn a one-goal deficit at WASA Ground in St. Joseph after Theo Hosein had given the hosts the lead on 59 minutes. Elsewhere, Jabari Mitchell and Shaquille Dublin scored on either side of the break to earn 1969 champions Point Fortin Civic a 2-0 win over Police FC’s Super League side at Police Barracks in St. James.

Result unknown but Guaya United advanced

Result unknown but 1976 Phoenix advanced

Quarterfinals
Former champions Morvant Caledonia United and Police FC, both of the Pro League, have booked their places into the 2017 FA Trophy semi-final round which is tentatively set November 26.

Morvant Caledonia edged Super League side Club Sando Moruga 1-0 courtesy Kareem Joseph’s late converted penalty before Police rallied from a goal down to beat rivals Defence Force 3-1 to complete the first quarter-final double-header at the Hasely Crawford Stadium training field on Tuesday afternoon. Neil Benjamin Jr. scored his 15th goal in all competitions this season to lift W Connection to a 1-0 win over Super League side Guaya United on Wednesday night to complete the last four of the 2017 FA Trophy.

Connection, FA champions of 1999, 2000, 2002 and 2013-14, joined Pro League compatriots and former champions Morvant Caledonia United and Police FC, and 1976 FC Phoenix—the last remaining team of 19 Super League clubs that were part of the competition this season—into the semi-final round which is expected to be contested on November 26.

Semifinals
W Connection and Police FC have set up an all-Pro League final of the 2017 FA Trophy on December 17 after comfortable semi-final wins yesterday over Tobago’s 1976 FC Phoenix, 3-0, and Morvant Caledonia United, 5-1, respectively, at Ato Boldon Stadium.

Neil Benjamin Jr. put four-time champions Connection ahead in just the fourth minute of the semi-final one against Phoenix before veteran attacker Hughtun Hector (26’) and Suriname forward Dimitri Apai (75’) sent the Tobagonians packing.

Later, Kareem Freitas scored a hat-trick, netting in the 19th, 54th and 84th minutes at the Couva venue, interrupted by the break and a double from teammate Elijah Belgrave (47th & 51st minutes) to as the Lawmen dispatched three-time former champions Morvant Caledonia, who grabbed a consolation item in the 90th minute through Sedale Mc Lean.

Final
W Connection celebrated a fifth FA Trophy, reuniting with the title they last won in 2014 after defeating 10-men Police FC 3-1 last night at the Home of Football, Ato Boldon Stadium in Couva to bring down the curtain on the 2017 season for top-flight clubs.

Veteran midfielder Hughtun Hector scored late on either side of the break to finish with a double and the eventual MVP award after Suriname international Dimitri Apai opened the 2017 final scoring for coach Stuart Charles-Fevrier’s men.

“It’s a great feeling; a Christmas feeling, to come away champions,” said W Connection assistant coach Earl Jean after his team were crowned the $100,000 2017 FA Trophy champions.

References

External links
Official Website

Trinidad and Tobago Cup
Trinidad and Tobago Cup
Cup